This is a list of infectious diseases arranged by name, along with the infectious agents that cause them and the vaccines that can prevent or cure them when they exist.

List

See also
 
 List of oncogenic bacteria
  − including specific infectious diseases and classes thereof

References

 Chin J. B., ed. Control of Communicable Diseases Manual. 17th ed. APHA [American Public Health Association] Press; 2000. 
 Red Book: 2009 Report of the Committee on Infectious Diseases. 2009. American Academy of Pediatrics. 28th ed. 
 Centers for Disease Control and Prevention. CDC Works 24/7. Retrieved on August 4, 2009.

+